The Battle of Failaka broke out between the Kuwaiti garrison of Failaka Island and attacking Iraqi forces during the Iraqi Invasion of Kuwait, on 2 August 1990. The Kuwaiti garrison consisted of an infantry company and a company of border guards, in addition to air defense company armed with Hawk SAMs. Iraqi forces consisted of a special forces battalion transported by helicopters reinforced with a battalion of marines.

Aftermath 
After the successful takeover by the Iraqi army, the island of Failaka was depopulated, with its 2,000 residents expelled to the mainland. The island was retaken by US forces in 1991, using tools of psychological warfare, making the Iraqi contingent of 1,400 surrender without a single shot.

References

See also 
 The Battle of the Bridges

1990 in Kuwait
Failaka
Military history of Kuwait
Failaka
August 1990 events in Asia
Conflicts in 1990